In mathematics, p-adic analysis is a branch of number theory that deals with the mathematical analysis of functions of p-adic numbers.

The theory of complex-valued numerical functions on the p-adic numbers is part of the theory of locally compact groups. The usual meaning taken for p-adic analysis is the theory of p-adic-valued functions on spaces of interest.

Applications of p-adic analysis have mainly been in number theory, where it has a significant role in diophantine geometry and diophantine approximation. Some applications have required the development of p-adic functional analysis and spectral theory. In many ways p-adic analysis is less subtle than classical analysis, since the ultrametric inequality means, for example, that convergence of infinite series of p-adic numbers is much simpler. Topological vector spaces over p-adic fields show distinctive features; for example aspects relating to convexity and the Hahn–Banach theorem are different.

Important results

Ostrowski's theorem

Ostrowski's theorem, due to Alexander Ostrowski (1916), states that every non-trivial absolute value on the rational numbers Q is equivalent to either the usual real absolute value or a -adic absolute value.

Mahler's theorem

Mahler's theorem, introduced by Kurt Mahler, expresses continuous p-adic functions in terms of polynomials.

In any field of characteristic 0, one has the following result.  Let

be the forward difference operator.  Then for polynomial functions f we have the Newton series:

where

is the kth binomial coefficient polynomial.

Over the field of real numbers, the assumption that the function f is a polynomial can be weakened, but it cannot be weakened all the way down to mere continuity.

Mahler proved the following result:

Mahler's theorem: If f is a continuous p-adic-valued function on the p-adic integers then the same identity holds.

Hensel's lemma

More generally it is used as a generic name for analogues for complete commutative rings (including p-adic fields in particular) of the Newton method for solving equations. Since p-adic analysis is in some ways simpler than real analysis, there are relatively easy criteria guaranteeing a root of a polynomial.

To state the result, let  be a polynomial with integer (or p-adic integer) coefficients, and let m,k be positive integers such that m ≤ k.  If r is an integer such that

 and 

then there exists an integer s such that

 and 

Furthermore, this s is unique modulo pk+m, and can be computed explicitly as

 where

Applications

P-adic quantum mechanics

P-adic quantum mechanics is a relatively recent approach to understanding the nature of fundamental physics. It is the application of p-adic analysis to quantum mechanics. The p-adic numbers are an intuitive arithmetic system (but geometrically counterintuitive) that was discovered by  German mathematician Kurt Hensel in about 1899 and by German mathematician Ernst Kummer(1810-1893) earlier in elementary form. The closely related adeles and ideles were introduced in the 1930s by Claude Chevalley and André Weil. Their study has now transformed into a major branch of mathematics. They were occasionally applied to the physical sciences, but it wasn't until a publication by the Russian mathematician Volovich in 1987 that the subject was taken seriously in the physics world.   There are now hundreds of research articles on the subject, along with international journals as well.

There are two main approaches to the subject.  The first considers particles in a p-adic potential well, and the goal is to find solutions with smoothly varying complex-valued wavefunctions. Here the solutions are to have a certain amount of familiarity from ordinary life. The second considers particles in p-adic potential wells, and the goal is to find p-adic valued wavefunctions. In this case, the physical interpretation is more difficult. Yet the math often exhibits striking characteristics, therefore people continue to explore it.  The situation was summed up in 2005 by one scientist as follows: "I simply cannot think of all this as a sequence of amusing accidents and dismiss it as a 'toy model'.  I think more work on this is both needed and worthwhile."

Local–global principle

Helmut Hasse's local–global principle, also known as the Hasse principle, is the idea that one can find an integer solution to an equation by using the Chinese remainder theorem to piece together solutions modulo powers of each different prime number. This is handled by examining the equation in the completions of the rational numbers: the real numbers and the p-adic numbers. A more formal version of the Hasse principle states that certain types of equations have a rational solution if and only if they have a solution in the real numbers and in the p-adic numbers for each prime p.

See also
 P-adic number
 P-adic Teichmüller theory
 Locally compact space
 Real analysis
 Complex analysis
 Hypercomplex analysis
 Harmonic analysis

References

Further reading
   
 
 
 (preprint)
A course in p-adic analysis, Alain Robert, Springer, 2000, 
Ultrametric Calculus: An Introduction to P-Adic Analysis, W. H. Schikhof, Cambridge University Press, 2007, 
P-adic Differential Equations, Kiran S. Kedlaya, Cambridge University Press, 2010, 

Number theory
Fields of mathematical analysis
p-adic numbers